IKLECTIK is a live experimental, electronic and free improvisation music and arts venue in Lambeth, London.

History 
Opened in July 2014, the venue is located in the Old Paradise Yard creative community on the northern border of Archbishop's Park.

The premises were formerly Kagyu Samye Dzong Tibetan Buddhist Centre and prior to that, the Holy Trinity School.

Since its opening, the venue has hosted music performances, artist residencies, exhibitions, poetry readings, performance art, films screenings and book launches. Notable past live performers include John Butcher, Philip Jeck, Lolina, Thurston Moore, Pat Thomas, Eddie Prevost, Daniel Miller, Gareth Jones, Emmanuelle Waeckerlé, SolarX, Steve Davis and Mark Fell.

The venue currently has installed a 13.4 ambisonic 3D sound system provided by Amoenus with a programme focusing on electronic sound and emerging technologies.

References

Links 
IKLECTIK Homepage
Amoenus Homepage

Music venues in London